Fronsac is a commune in the Gironde department in the Nouvelle-Aquitaine region in southwestern France. The town gave its name to the Fronsac AOC wine.

Geography
Fronsac is 40 km northeast of Bordeaux and 5 km northwest of Libourne and the Saint-Émilion and Pomerol appellations.

History
Fronsac's mound owes its history to its privileged position. It was the site of the Gauls' market, the Romans erected an altar there, and Charlemagne built a fortified camp on the mound ("Franciacus") in 769, where the Basques led by duke Lupo came to pledge allegiance to the Frankish King after Aquitaine's submission. In 849, Fronsac was pillaged by Hasting, the chief of the Vikings. The Marechal of Richelieu had a "folly" built there, to an extravagant architectural design, where he held courtly entertainments. As word spread of these events, the renown of Fronsac's wines was carried with it to the Court of Versailles. In the 18th Century, the names of Fronsac and Canon Fronsac enjoyed a very good reputation. It was at this time that the concept of "cru" first appeared in the Libournais.

Population

Administration

Sights
 Saint-Martin's Church, which is classed as a Monument historique, (historical monument).

Personalities
 Guillaume-Sanche de Pommiers, Sire of Pommiers, Viscount of Fronsac
 Joachim Rouhault de Gamaches

International Relations
  Fronsac is twinned with Pasiano di Pordenone.

Wine
Situated on the right bank of the Gironde River, the commune is an appellation in itself, as well as a sub-appellation, Canon-Fronsac AOC.

See also
 Communes of the Gironde department
 Guyenne
 Plan Bordeaux
 Bordeaux wine regions

References

External links

 Fronsac wine information

Communes of Gironde